Jade Baraldo (born September 28, 1998) is a Brazilian singer and songwriter who participated in the reality show The Voice Brazil.  Baraldo finished as a semifinalist. Baraldo moved to Rio de Janeiro at age 18 to pursue a musical career. Her debut single Brasa reached #1 on Spotify's Viral chart in Brazil.

References

1998 births
Living people
21st-century Brazilian singers
The Voice (franchise) contestants
Brazilian composers
Brazilian singer-songwriters
21st-century Brazilian women singers
Brazilian women singer-songwriters